The 4th Illinois General Assembly, consisting of the Illinois Senate and the Illinois House of Representatives, met from November 15, 1824, to January 18, 1825, and again from January 2, 1826, to January 18, 1826,  at The Vandalia State House.  The apportionment of seats in the House of Representatives was based on the provisions of the First Illinois Constitution. Political parties were not established in the State at the time.

The 4th General Assembly was preceded by the 3rd Illinois General Assembly, and was succeeded by the 5th Illinois General Assembly.

Members
This list is arranged by chamber, then by county. Senators and Representatives were both allotted to counties roughly by population and elected at-large within their districts.

Senate
Bond County
 Francis Kirkpatrick

Crawford County
 Daniel Parker

Edwards County
 Stephen Bliss

Gallatin County
 Michael Jones

Greene County
 Thomas Carlin (elected in special election December 13, 1824)

Hamilton County'
Thomas Sloo

Jackson County
 Joseph Duncan

Johnson County
John Ewing

Madison County
 Theophilus W. Smith (resigned after first session)
 Joseph Conway (second session)

Monroe County
 Joseph A. Beaird

Pope County
 Lewis Barker

Randolph County
Raphael Widen

'Sangamon County
Stephen Stillman

St. Clair County
 James Lemen

Union County
 John Grammar

Washington County
 Andrew Bankson

'Wayne County
James Bird

White County
 Daniel Hay

House of Representatives
'Alexander County
 Henry L. Webb

Bond County
 John Russell

Clark County
 William B. Archer

Crawford County
 David Stewart
 David McGahey

Edwards County
 Henry Utter

Fayette County, Illinois
 John A. Wakefield

Franklin County
 Thomas Dorris

Gallatin County
 Timothy Gara

Jackson County
 Conrad Will

Jefferson County
 Zadok Casey

Johnson County
 John Bridges

Lawrence County
 Asa Norton

Madison County
 Curtis Brakeman
 George Churchill
 William Otwell

Monroe County
 Gerge Forquer
 Thomas James

''Pike County
Nicholas Hansen 
Levi Roberts

Pope County
William Sims
James A. Whiteside

Randolph County
Gabriel Jones
Elias K. Kane
Thomas Mather
Samuel Smith
Samuel Walker

'Sangamon County
William S. Hamilton

St. Clair County
David Blackwell
Risden Moore
Abraham Eyman

Union County
John Whitaker
John Hacker

Washington County
Philo Beers

Wayne County
Rigdon B. Slocum

White County
William McHenry
George R. Logan
Alexander Phillips

Employees

Senate 
 Secretary: Emanuel J. West
 Enrolling and Engrossing Clerk: Albert G. Sloo
 Sergeant at Arms: Benjamin Ogle (second session: Thomas Higgins)

House of Representatives 
 Clerk: Charles Dunn
 Enrolling and Engrossing Clerk:  R.P. Allen
 Doorkeeper: James S. Smith (second session: Thomas Redman)

See also
 List of Illinois state legislatures

Notes

References

Illinois legislative sessions
Illinois
Illinois
Illinois